MACHO 176.18833.411 (OGLE BLG-RRLYR-10353) is an RR Lyrae variable star located in the galactic bulge of our Milky Way Galaxy. However, it is not a galactic bulge star, it is a galactic halo star, which is on the part of its elliptical orbit that brings it within the bulge before returning to the outer parts of the galaxy, the halo. Its nature was discovered as part of the BRAVA-RR survey.

References

RR Lyrae variables
Sagittarius (constellation)